Bastonville is an unincorporated community in Glascock County, in the U.S. state of Georgia.

History
A post office was established at Bastonville from 1890, and remained in operation until 1902. Nathan T. Baston, an early postmaster, gave the community his last name.

References

Unincorporated communities in Glascock County, Georgia
Unincorporated communities in Georgia (U.S. state)